Harold Bennett (1898–1981) was an English actor.

Harold Bennett may also refer to:

Harold Bennett (footballer) (1891–1964), Australian rules footballer
Harold Aubie Bennett (1891–1978), British musician
Harold Harper Bennett (1900–1999), American business leader and singer
Hal Bennett (1936–2004), American author
Harold Bennett, pseudonym of Henry Fillmore (1881–1956), American musician, composer, publisher and bandleader

See also
Harry Bennett (disambiguation)
Harold William Bennetts (1898–1970), Australian veterinary surgeon